The 1886 Harvard Crimson football team represented Harvard University in the 1886 college football season. The team finished with a 12–2 record and outscored opponents 765 to 41 under first-year head coach Frank A. Mason. On November 3, 1886, in a game played at Exeter, New Hampshire, the Crimson defeated the team from Phillips Exeter Academy by a score of 158-0, the highest point total ever achieved in a football game to that point.  The team's two losses were against rivals Princeton (0–12) and Yale (4–29). Princeton and Yale are recognized by various selectors as the 1886 national champions.

Schedule

References

Harvard
Harvard Crimson football seasons
Harvard Crimson football